Hoki Sport Klub Csíkszereda is a professional ice hockey club based in Miercurea Ciuc, Romania.  They play in the country's top-level championship, the Romanian Hockey League, and also participate in the international competition Erste Liga, which features teams from Hungary, Romania and Austria. SC is one of the most successful teams in the domestic championship with 15 titles, including six in a row between 2007 and 2012.

History
Situated in the Ciuc Basin, one of the coldest regions in the country, it offers an ideal background for wintersports. Skating on meadows flooded by a watercourse began in the 1870s, and the first skating association, the Csíkszeredai Korcsolyázó Egylet was founded in 1881.

The birth of the ice hockey team is dated to 1929, when some young man saw a film about ice hockey match and became encouraged to form their own club. Upon hearing the creation of the new team, Bucharest-based Tenis Club Român invited Csíkszereda to a friendly match, that was won by the hosts to 4–0. On 24–25 January 1931 Tenis Club were called for a rematch, where they first clinched another 4–0 victory, however, on the following day the game ended 1–1, with Jenő Császár scoring the first ever goal of Csíkszereda. This goal was also the first in the history of Romanian ice hockey that was photographed.

The team entered the Romanian championship in 1933, but due to the lack of financial and infrastructural background they could not compete with Bucharest clubs. In addition, from the mid-1930s more and more talented players left the club to join league the rivals HC Brâila and Telefon Club, which later became the national champion.

After the Second Vienna Award in 1940, the city was reassigned to Hungary, and the team entered the Hungarian league. The skate rink of Csíkszereda was modernized and it hosted the national championship in 1943–44. Following the World War II the Second Vienna Award was cancelled and the area fell under Romanian administration again.

The club's first success came in 1949, when they obtained the Romanian Hockey League title, which was followed by another 4 titles until 1963. In January 1971 the newly built ice hall was handed over. The club suffered a set-back in the coming decades and it could not win another league title until 1997. In 1999 the ice hall took the name of club legend and founder of the hockey team, Lajos Vákár. Since the second part of the 2000s Csíkszereda proved to be untouchable in the domestic championship and they are also one of the dominant teams of the MOL Liga.

Achievements 
Romanian Hockey League:
Winners (17): 1949, 1952, 1957, 1960, 1963, 1997, 2000, 2004, 2007, 2008, 2009, 2010, 2011, 2012, 2013, 2018, 2022
Romanian Cup:
Winners (15) :1950, 1952, 1995, 2002, 2004, 2007, 2008, 2010, 2011, 2014, 2016, 2018, 2019, 2020, 2022
Panonian League:
Winners (1) : 2004
Erste Liga:
Winners (4) : 2011, 2020, 2021, 2022

Notes

References
 Kész, Lóránd (2009), A csíkszeredai jégkorong türténete.

External links
 Official Website

Ice hockey teams in Romania
Ice hockey teams in Hungary
Panonian League teams
Erste Liga (ice hockey) teams
Ice hockey clubs established in 1929
Sport in Miercurea Ciuc
1929 establishments in Romania